The 1939–40 season in Swedish football, starting August 1939 and ending July 1940:

Honours

Official titles

Competitions

Promotions, relegations and qualifications

Promotions

League transfers

Relegations

Domestic results

Allsvenskan 1939–40

Allsvenskan promotion play-off 1939–40

Division 2 Norra 1939–40

Division 2 Östra 1939–40

Division 2 Västra 1939–40

Division 2 Södra 1939–40

Division 2 promotion play-off 1939–40

National team results 

 Sweden: 

 Sweden:

National team players in season 1939/40

Notes

References 
Print

Online

 
Seasons in Swedish football